Slijkenburg is a village in Weststellingwerf in the province of Friesland, the Netherlands. It had a population of around 36 in 2017.

It is the southernmost village of Friesland, located at the Overijssel provincial border.

The village was first mentioned in 1398 as Slickenborg, and refers to a borg on silted soil.

In 1580, a sluice was built in Slijkenburg. In 1672, a sconce was built around the village to protect against the Prince-Bishop of Münster. Slijkenburg was home to 68 people in 1840.

References

External links

Geography of Weststellingwerf
Populated places in Friesland